Jean-Louis Aubert (born 12 April 1955) is a French singer-songwriter, guitarist, composer and producer. He went on a solo career after the split of the rock band Téléphone that he co-founded.

Early life 
Born in Nantua, Ain, France in 1955, Aubert and his two sisters moved with his parents to Senlis, Oise, where his father was a sub-prefect. He was raised by their service people. In 1965, his family moved to Paris. Although he was in the scouts and the choir, Aubert was a difficult child.

Later, he went to school at Lycée Pasteur (Neuilly-sur-Seine) with his friends Louis Bertignac and Olivier Caudron. At the age of 15, they founded their first band, Masturbation. He got his high school diploma in 1973. Rarely focused on his studies, he was already dedicating most of his time to music.

French charts with rock band Téléphone:
 Anna: 2
 Crache ton venin: 2
 Au coeur de la nuit:3
 Dure limite: 1
 Un autre monde: 2

French awards:
"Victoire de la musique" 1985 with rock band Téléphone.
"Sacem price musique vivante" 1985 with Téléphone.
"Album RTL" 2011.
"victoire de la musique" Roc éclair tour 2012.
"victoire de la musique" 30 ans de rock 2015.

Solo discography 
(For discography with French rock band Téléphone, refer to discography section)

Studio albums

Live albums

Live DVD 
 Comme on a fait (2003, Virgin)
 Idéal Tour (2006, Virgin)
 Un tour sur moi-même, avec vous (2008, Virgin)

 Compilation 
 Comme on a dit (2003, Virgin) 1986–2003

 Box Set 
 Long Box (2002, 3 CDs, Virgin) 1986–2001

Singles

 Filmography 
 As composer 
 Pour faire un bon voyage, prenons le train (short), 1973
 I've Loved You So Long (Il ya longtemps que je t'aime), 2007
 One for the Road (Le Dernier pour la route), 2009
 Jealousy (La Jalousie), 2013
 In the Shadow of Women (L'Ombre des femmes''), 2015

References

External links 

 
 Official site (in French)
 Locataires – Fan site (in French)
 Biography of Jean-Louis Aubert, from Radio France Internationale (in English)
 Biography of Jean-Louis Aubert published in 2006 (in French)

1955 births
Living people
People from Nantua
French male singers
French singer-songwriters
Lycée Pasteur (Neuilly-sur-Seine) alumni
French composers
French male singer-songwriters